Spence is a surname. Notable people with the surname include:

 Ara Spence (1793–1866), American judge from Maryland
 Basil Spence (1907–1976), British architect
 Brent Spence (1874–1967), American politician, attorney, and banker
 Catherine Helen Spence, Australian reformer and suffragette
 Charles Spence, experimental psychologist at the University of Oxford
 Derek Spence (born 1952), Irish footballer
 Djed Spence (born 2000), English footballer
 E. Lee Spence, American author, editor, adventurer and underwater archaeologist
 Fiona Spence, British-Australian actress
 Floyd Spence, American politician
 George Spence (Canadian politician) (1880–1975), Canadian  politician
 George Spence (MP) (1787–1850), British politician
 George Spence (footballer, born 1877) (1877–?), Scottish footballer
 George Spence (footballer, born 1904) (1904–?), English footballer
 Gerry Spence, American trial lawyer
 James Spence, Scottish Surgeon 
 Joe Spence (footballer born 1898), English footballer for Manchester United in the 1920s
 Joe Spence (footballer born 1925), English footballer for York City in the 1950s
 John Brodie Spence, South Australian banker and politician, brother of Catherine
 John S. Spence, American politician from Maryland
 John Selby Spence (Catholic bishop), American Catholic bishop
 John Spence (politician), British politician
 John Spence (musician), founding member of the band No Doubt
 Jonathan Spence, English historian
 Jordan Spence (disambiguation), several people
 Joseph Spence (author), English anecdotist
 Joseph Spence (musician), Bahamian guitarist and blues musician
 Julian Spence (1929–1990), American football player
 Kenneth Spence, prominent American psychologist
 Lansford Spence, Jamaican sprinter
 Lewis Spence, journalist and writer
 Linda Spence, Irish-Scottish cricketer
 Louie Spence, British dancer
 Michael Spence, American economist
 Nicky Spence, Scottish opera singer
 Noah Spence, American football player
 Phil Spence, American basketball player and coach
 Russell Spence, English race car driver
 Sam Spence (born 1927), American composer and musician
 Shaun Spence (born 1991), Australian rugby player
 Sion Spence (born 2000), Welsh footballer
 Skip Spence, musician
 Steve Spence, American long-distance runner
 Thomas Spence, Radical democrat
 Toby Spence (born 1969), English tenor
 Vivienne Spence, Jamaican track and field athlete
 William Spence, Australian trade union leader and politician
 William Wallace Spence (1815–1915), American financier
 Willie Spence (1999–2022), American singer
 Wishart Spence, Canadian judge

English-language surnames
Surnames of Norman origin
Norman-language surnames

de:Spence
fr:Spence